PascalABC.NET is a Pascal programming language that implements classic Pascal, most Delphi language features, as well as a number of their own extensions. It is implemented on the .NET Framework platform and contains all the modern language features, such as classes, operator overloading, interfaces, exception handling, generic classes and routines, garbage collection, lambda expressions, parallel programming tools (OpenMP only as of 2016).

PascalABC.NET is also a simple and powerful integrated development environment with an integrated debugger, IntelliSense system, form designer, code templates and code auto-formatting. The command-line PascalABC.NET compiler is also available on Linux and MacOS (under Mono).

PascalABC.NET is popular in Russian schools and universities. In the Southern Federal University, it is used as the main language for teaching students of Information Technology in the course "Fundamentals of programming", and for teaching children in one of the largest computer schools in Russia.

Key features of PascalABC.NET

Pascal language extensions 
 Operators += -= *= /=
 in-block variable definitions
 Variable declaration in for loop header
 Variable declaration with initialization (var n: integer := 10;)
 Variable type deduction (var x := 1;)
 foreach
 Routines with a variable number of parameters
 set of any type (set of integer)
 Methods in records
 Methods defined in class declaration
 Simplified syntax of units
 Keyword new (invoking a constructor)
 Field initializers
 Operator overloading
 Static constructors
 Directives OpenMP
 case for strings
 function type syntax T->T
 tuple type syntax (T1, T2)
 yield and yield sequence
 pattern matching
 array slices
 interpolated strings
 unpacking of parameters of lambda expressions into variables

System units 
Most units are focused on education:
 Raster graphics units GraphABC (based on Windows Forms), GraphWPF (based on WPF)
 Vector graphics units ABCObjects (based on Windows Forms), WPFObjects (based on WPF)
 3D graphics & animation unit Graph3D (based on the Helix Toolkit library)
 Unit FormsABC to create simple windows application without form designer
 Units-executors Robot and Drawman (school computer science)

Samples

1. Swap the first and second halves of an array 
begin
  var a := ArrGen(10,i->2*i+1);
  a.Println;
  Assert(a.Length mod 2 = 0);
  var n := a.Length div 2;
  a := a[n:] + a[:n];
  a.Println; 
end.

2. 100! 
begin
  var p: BigInteger := 1;
  for var i:=1 to 100 do
    p := p * i;
  Println(p);
end.

3. Greater common divisor of two integers 
begin
  var (a, b) := ReadInteger2;
  while b > 0 do
    (a, b) := (b, a mod b);
  var GCD := Abs(a);
  GCD.Print;
end.

4. Display all Fibonacci numbers less than 1000 
begin
  SeqWhile(1,1,(x,y)->x+y,x->x<1000).Print;
end.

5. Word frequency dictionary for a file 
begin
  var d := new Dictionary<string,integer>;
  foreach var s in ReadLines('words.txt') do
    foreach var word in s.ToWords do
      d[word] := d.Get(word) + 1;
  d.PrintLines;
end.

5а. Word frequency dictionary for a file - Solution in functional style 
begin
  ReadLines('words.txt').SelectMany(s->s.ToWords).GroupBy(v->v).EachCount.PrintLines;
end.

6. Parallel matrix multiplication using OpenMP directives 
procedure Mult(a,b,c: array [,] of real; n: integer);
begin
  {$omp parallel for}
  for var i:=0 to n-1 do
    for var j:=0 to n-1 do
    begin  
       var cc := 0.0;
       for var l:=0 to n-1 do
          cc += a[i,l]*b[l,j];
       c[i,j] := cc;   
    end;
end;
 
const n = 1000;
 
begin
  var a := MatrixRandomReal(n,n,1,1.1);
  var b := MatrixRandomReal(n,n,1,1.1);
  var c := new real[n,n];
  Mult(a,b,c,n);
  Println(MillisecondsDelta/1000);
end.

See also 
 Object Pascal
 C#

References

External links 
 
 PascalABC.NET Github Repository
 Official Telegram Channel PascalABC.NET

Object-oriented programming languages
Class-based programming languages
.NET programming languages
Pascal (programming language) compilers
Pascal programming language family
Statically typed programming languages